Prunus tatsienensis is a putative species of cherry native to Henan, Hubei, Shaanxi, Shanxi, Sichuan and Yunnan provinces of China, typically found at 900–2600m above sea level. It is a shrub or low tree 2–5m tall. It differs from Prunus polytricha in that it has disciform apical glands in the margins of its bracts. This trait is not found in the original description and is not found in the type specimen, suggesting that it is conspecific with Prunus polytricha and with Prunus clarofolia, which also lacks sufficiently differing characters.

References

tatsienensis
Cherries
Endemic flora of China
Flora of North-Central China
Flora of South-Central China
Flora of Southeast China
Plants described in 1898